Morteza Haj Seyed Ahmadi (1 November 1924 – 21 December 2014) was an Iranian actor, voice actor, singer, and writer.

Ahmadi, who is known for nearly five decades of memorable performances, was born in 1924 in a neighborhood in the south of the capital Tehran. In addition to being one of the most successful figures in the Iranian cinema, Ahmadi was known for his dubbing career. He was also known for singing different songs, including innovative types. Among Ahmadi’s works are Autobus, Madrak-e Jorm (exhibit piece) and Khane-kharab (homeless). He died on 21 December 2014.

Early life and background
Morteza Ahmadi was born on 1 November 1924 in south Tehran. He grew up in a working class part of Maktab and later attended Manouchehri school at first and later to Roushan and Sharaf high schools. At age 16, Ahmadi started playing football and joined his school's football team. Later, he joined Rah Ahan and played for the club's amateur team until 1944. He was then employed at Iranian Railways as a repairman.

Career
After several amateur theaters, he and his friends established the Tamashakhaneye Mah theater near Bagh-e Ferdows in 1942. He then began Pardeh Khani for the first time in 1942. In the same year, he signed Golpari Joon. After that, he was invited to Radio Tehran. He then being banned for six months from his work after he signed a track criticizing Iran's Democratic Party, naming Pirhan Zarde (The yellow shirts) that was the same as the party's colour. Later the ruling was cancelled by Supreme Court and he returns to radio.

After 1953 Iranian coup d'état, Ahmadi left Tehran and began living in Ahvaz. After seven years, he returns to Tehran and acted in a TV-series named Tak Mezrab. He then acted in Hassan Kachal and Soltan-e Sahebgharan.

Personal life
Ahmadi married Zahra Javanshir, his colleague at Iranian Railway on 31 July 1955. Zahra died on 15 May 1971 due to cancer. The couple had one daughter, Azita (born 1958), and one son, Maziar (born 1961).

Ahmadi was a long-time fan of Persepolis F.C. and was honored by the club in 2010 as the oldest recognized fan of the club at the time. He attended all Persepolis' home matches at Azadi Stadium until 2013, before his illness. He also wears a red scarf and seats in the number 6 seat of the stadium.

Death
Morteza Ahmadi died on 21 December 2014 at 11 A.M. at his private house in Tehran. His funeral was held on 24 December and he was buried at Behesht-e Zahra cemetery.

References

External links

1924 births
2014 deaths
Iranian comedians
Iranian memoirists
People from Tehran
Iranian folk singers
Iranian male singers
Iranian lexicographers
Male actors from Tehran
Iranian male film actors
Iranian male voice actors
Burials at Behesht-e Zahra
Iranian male television actors
20th-century Iranian male singers
Burials at artist's block of Behesht-e Zahra